Layton cemetery is a graveyard located at Talbot Road in Blackpool, Lancashire in England. It was opened in 1873 when Blackpool parish church was replete with burying. The site encompasses , having been regularly expanded during its history. It is administered by Blackpool Council. A number of memorials in the cemetery are executed in Portland stone.

The cemetery was designed and laid out by Garlick, Park and Sykes, architects of Preston. Originally there were three mortuary chapels, Anglican, Catholic and Non-Conformist but only the Anglican remains. There was a lodge at the entrance which provided a residence and office for the custodian. The original part of the cemetery was surrounded a stone wall, topped with iron railings with a double iron gate at the entrance. These structures are extant. A World War I memorial is centrally situated.

In the 1930s, the cemetery was rapidly nearing capacity and therefore a new cemetery and crematorium were opened, known as Carleton Crematorium and Cemetery. Layton Cemetery is now replete but interments are permitted in existing graves.

Notable interments
 Dick Barlow, England test cricketer
 Gerald Irving Richardson, Superintendent of Lancashire Constabulary. Posthumously awarded the George Cross.
 George Washington Williams, Afro-American historian
 Samuel Laycock, dialect poet
 Edwin Hughes, last survivor of the Charge of the Light Brigade
 Alfred Tysoe, British athlete, winner of two gold medals at the 1900 Olympic Games
 Spencer Timothy Hall, writer and mesmerist
 Ada Boswell, Queen of the Gypsies
 Joe Longthorne, entertainer

War Graves
Layton Cemetery contains the graves of 139 Commonwealth service personnel of World War I and 39 of World War II, besides, from the latter war, 26 airmen of the Polish Air Force (whose headquarters in exile were in Talbot Square in the town), and one airman of the Royal Yugoslav Air Force.

Gallery

References

External links 

 Friends of Layton Cemetery
 

Cemeteries in Lancashire
Geography of Blackpool
Commonwealth War Graves Commission cemeteries in England